Langley Kirkwood (born 14 April 1973) is a South African actor and triathlete. Besides appearing in films such as Invictus, Dredd and Mia and the White Lion, Langley has participated several times in the South African Ironman competition. His father is West Indian and his mother is South African. He was married to and has three children with South African supermodel and photographer Josie Borain.

Selected filmography

Film
 1999 - Pirates of the Plain - Credit manager
 2001 - Final Solution - Pieter
 2003 - Citizen Verdict - Vince Turner
 2003 - Consequence - Pope Agent
 2003 - Red Water - Brett Van Ryan
 2003 - The Bone Snatcher - Paul
 2004 - Charlie - Eddy Richardson
 2004 - In My Country - Boetie
 2004 - Berserker - Norseman
 2004 - Blast - Agent Phillips
 2004 - King Solomon's Mines - Sergei
 2004 - Dracula 3000 - Orlock
 2004 - Murmur - Billy
 2004 - Dead Easy - Lloyd
 2006 - Mercenary for Justice - Kreuger
 2007 - The Three Investigators and the Secret of Skeleton Island - Tom Farraday
 2008 - Coronation Street: Out of Africa - Ed Teal
 2009 - Endgame - Jack Swart
 2009 - Invictus - Presidential Guard
 2011 - Atlantis - Rusa
 2012 - Dredd - Judge Lex
 2012 - Death Race 3: Inferno - Dr. Klein
 2014 - SEAL Team 8: Behind Enemy Lines - Lieutenant Parker
 2014 - The Salvation
 2007 - Mia and the White Lion - John Owen
 2022 - Elesin Oba, The King's Horseman

Television
 1997 - Natural Rhythm - Pedro
 1998 - Isidingo - Gustav
 2004 - Snitch - Bob Mailer
 2005 - Charlie Jade - Ren Porter
 2005 - The Triangle - Bill Granger
 2007 - Wild at Heart - Johnny
 2007 - Hard Copy - Jason Cornish
 2008 - Generation Kill - Sgt. Steven Lovell
 2009 - The Prisoner - Fire officer
 2011 - Strike Back - Dieter Henricks
 2012 - Leonardo - Felipe Visconti
 2013 - The Bible - Elderly David
 2013 - Feynman and the Challenger - Avionics engineer
 2014 - Black Sails - Captain Bryson
 2014 - Dominion - Jeep Hanson
 2015 - Banshee - Col. Douglas Stowe
 2019 - Warrior - Walter Buckley
 2023 - One Piece - Captain Morgan

References

External links
 Official site
 

1973 births
Living people
People from Bromley
English male film actors
English male television actors
20th-century English male actors
21st-century English male actors
South African male film actors
South African male television actors
20th-century South African male actors
21st-century South African male actors
South African people of English descent
English male triathletes
Male actors from Kent
British male triathletes